Men's super combined competition at the FIS Alpine World Ski Championships 2009 was run on 9 February, the sixth race of the championships.

Results

References
 FIS-ski.com - official results
 Ski Racing.com - Worlds: Svindal wins combined, bout Lizeroux stars - 09-Feb-2009

Men's super combined